Los simuladores is a Mexican television series produced by Sony Pictures Television International for Televisa. It is an adaptation on the Argentine serie of the same name created by Damián Szifron, and stars Arath de la Torre, Alejandro Calva, Rubén Zamora, and Tony Dalton.

Cast 
 Arath de la Torre as Emilio Vargas
 Alejandro Calva as Pablo López
 Rubén Zamora as Gabriel Medina
 Tony Dalton as Mario Santos

Episodes

Series overview

Season 1 (2008)

Season 2 (2009)

References

External links 
 

Mexican television series
Televisa original programming
Sony Entertainment Television original programming
2008 Mexican television series debuts
2009 Mexican television series endings